Jan Piecyk (17 September 1940 – September 2021) was a Polish footballer who played as a defender.

Career 
Piecyk started his career with Gwarek Tarnowskie Góry. Later he joined the Rapid Wełnowiec club from Katowice. In 1965 he joined the Polish Ekstraklasa club GKS Katowice (as a result of the merger of GKS and Rapid), for which he appeared in 87 matches and scored two goals. He retired from football in 1971.

Personal life 
He lived in Katowice.

Death 
He died in September 2021, at the age of 80 or 81.

References 

1940 births
2021 deaths
Polish footballers
Association football defenders
GKS Katowice players
Ekstraklasa players